Sowmeeh (also Romanized as Şowme‘eh and Sūma‘eh) is a village in Mazul Rural District, in the Central District of Nishapur County, Razavi Khorasan Province, Iran. At the 2006 census, its population was 963, in 306 families.

References 

Populated places in Nishapur County